Glen Helen may refer to:

Glen Helen, Isle of Man
Glen Helen Gorge, MacDonnell Ranges, Australia
Glen Helen Nature Preserve, owned by Glen Helen Association (earlier Antioch College) in Yellow Springs, Ohio, United States
Glen Helen Regional Park in San Bernardino, California, United States
Glen Helen Pavilion, former name of the San Manuel Amphitheater
Glen Helen Raceway